The Americas Zone was one of the three zones of the regional Davis Cup competition in 1997.

In the Americas Zone there were four different tiers, called groups, in which teams competed against each other to advance to the upper tier. The top two teams in Group III advanced to the Americas Zone Group II in 1998, whereas the bottom two teams were relegated to the Americas Zone Group IV in 1998.

Participating nations

Draw
 Venue: Southampton Princess Hotel, Southampton, Bermuda
 Date: 29 April–3 May

Group A

Group B

1st to 4th place play-offs

5th to 8th place play-offs

Final standings

  and  promoted to Group II in 1998.
  and  relegated to Group IV in 1998.

Round robin

Group A

Antigua and Barbuda vs. Trinidad and Tobago

Barbados vs. Panama

Antigua and Barbuda vs. Barbados

Panama vs. Trinidad and Tobago

Antigua and Barbuda vs. Panama

Barbados vs. Trinidad and Tobago

Group B

Bolivia vs. Dominican Republic

Guatemala vs. Jamaica

Bolivia vs. Jamaica

Dominican Republic vs. Guatemala

Bolivia vs. Guatemala

Dominican Republic vs. Jamaica

1st to 4th place play-offs

Semifinals

Panama vs. Jamaica

Antigua and Barbuda vs. Guatemala

Final

Jamaica vs. Guatemala

3rd to 4th play-off

Panama vs. Antigua and Barbuda

5th to 8th place play-offs

5th to 8th play-offs

Trinidad and Tobago vs. Dominican Republic

Barbados vs. Bolivia

5th to 6th play-off

Dominican Republic vs. Bolivia

7th to 8th play-off

Trinidad and Tobago vs. Barbados

References

External links
Davis Cup official website

Davis Cup Americas Zone
Americas Zone Group III